The 2004 M&M Meat Shops Masters of Curling was held from December 9 to 12, 2004 at the Elgar Petersen Arena in Humboldt, Saskatchewan. The event was one of the four men's Grand Slams of the 2004–05 curling season. 

Winnipeg's Jeff Stoughton rink won the event, defeating Moose Jaw, Saskatchewan's Pat Simmons rink in the final, 5–4. Stoughton won the event by stealing a point in the 11th end, and took home $30,000 for the win. Simmons won $18,000. It was Stoughton's second career Grand Slam win. 

The event had a triple knockout format. The top 12 teams (as of August 30) in the world qualified, plus the top 2 teams on the World Curling Tour money list (as of November 21), plus one European team and one sponsor exemption. The total purse for the event was $100,000. The WCT second ranked Glenn Howard rink and the fifth ranked Wayne Middaugh rink did not participate, as they were participating in the playdowns for the 2005 Ontario Kia Cup.

The semifinals and finals aired on Sportsnet.

Teams
The teams were as follows:

Playoffs
The playoff scores were as follows:

References

Masters Of Curling
Humboldt, Saskatchewan
Curling in Saskatchewan
Masters of Curling
Masters of Curling
Masters (curling)